Narcissus × medioluteus (syn. Narcissus biflorus), common names primrose-peerless, April beauty, cemetery ladies, loving couples, pale narcissus, twin sisters, two-flowered narcissus, is a flowering plant, which is a naturally occurring hybrid between Narcissus poeticus and Narcissus tazetta (informally called "poetaz hybrid"). It was found initially in the West of France.

This first poetaz narcissus has long been grown as a garden ornamental and has also become naturalised in Great Britain, Ireland, Switzerland, Spain, Portugal, the former Yugoslavia, Madeira, New Zealand, and in scattered locales in the eastern United States (Michigan, Illinois, Missouri, Indiana, Ohio, Kentucky, Tennessee, Georgia, Alabama, Arkansas, Louisiana, Maryland, North Carolina, South Carolina and Virginia).

The flowers are generally held in pairs, hence the common names "Twin Sisters" and "Loving Couples". The fragrant cream flowers (medioluteus) are smaller than those of Narcissus poeticus. The cup lacks a red edge.

Other poetaz hybrids have several flowers per stem, and some have double flowers.

Gallery

photo of herbarium specimen at Missouri Botanical Garden, collected in Missouri, Narcissus x medioluteus

References

medioluteus
Hybrid plants
Flora of France
Plants described in 1768